Marketing buzz or simply buzz—a term used in viral marketing—is the interaction of consumers and users of a product or service which amplifies or alters the original marketing message. This emotion, energy, excitement, or anticipation about a product or service can be positive or negative. Buzz can be generated by intentional marketing activities by the brand owner or it can be the result of an independent event that enters public awareness through social or traditional media such as newspapers. Marketing buzz originally referred to oral communication but in the age of Web 2.0, social media such as Facebook, Twitter, Instagram and YouTube are now the dominant communication channels for marketing buzz.

Strategies
Some of the common tactics used to create buzz include building suspense around a launch or event, creating a controversy, or reaching out to bloggers and social media influencers. Social media participants in any particular virtual community can be divided into three segments:  influencers, individuals, and consumers. Influencers amplify both positive and negative messages to the target audience, often because of their reputation within the community. Therefore, a successful social media campaign must find and engage with influencers that are positively inclined to the brand, providing them with product information and incentives to forward it on to the community. Individuals are members of the community who find value in absorbing the content and interacting with other members. The purpose of the marketing strategy is ultimately to turn individuals into the third group, consumers, who actually purchase the product in the real world and then develop brand loyalty that forms the basis for ongoing positive marketing buzz. The challenge for the marketer is to understand the potentially complex dynamics of the virtual community and be able to use them effectively.

Development of a social media marketing strategy must also take into account interaction with traditional media including the potential both for synergies, where the two combine to greater effect, and cannibalism, where one takes market from the other, leading to no real market expansion. This can be seen in the growing connection between marketing buzz and traditional television broadcasts. Shows monitor buzz, encouraging audience participation on social media during broadcasts, and in 2013 the Nielsen ratings were expanded to include social media rankings based on Twitter buzz. But the best known example is the Super Bowl advertising phenomenon. Companies build anticipation before the game using different tactics that include releasing the ads or teasers for them on-line, soliciting user input such as Doritos’ Crash the Super Bowl competition where on-line voting between consumer created ads determines which will air during the game, and purposefully generating controversy, such as the 2013 and 2014 SodaStream ads that were rejected by the network airing the game for directly naming competitors.

For advertising to generate effective positive buzz, research has shown that it must engage the viewer’s emotions in a positive way. Budweiser’s Super Bowl advertising has been the most successful at generating buzz as measured by the USA Today Super Bowl Ad Meter survey over its 26-year history, a testament to its masterful use of heartwarming stories, cute baby animals, majestic horses, and core American values to stir the positive emotions of audiences across a wide range of demographics. Using controversy to generate marketing buzz can be risky because research shows that while mild controversy stimulates more buzz than completely neutral topics, as the topic becomes more uncomfortable the amount of buzz drops significantly. The most buzz will be generated in a “sweet spot” where the topic is interesting enough to invite comment, but not controversial enough to keep people away. There is also substantial risk of generating negative buzz when using controversy, for example Coca-Cola’s 2014 It’s Beautiful ad that aired during the Super Bowl and generated substantial backlash.

Measurement
Two common terms used to describe buzz are volume, which quantifies the number of interchanges related to a product or topic in a given time period, and rating or level, a more qualitative measure of the positive or negative sentiment or amount of engagement associated with the product. Basic social media measures of buzz volume include visits, views, mentions, followers and subscribers; next level measures such as shares, replies, clicks, re-tweets, comments and wall posts provide a better indication of the participants' engagement levels because they require action in response to an initial communication.

It is possible for firms to track the marketing buzz of their products online using buzz monitoring. Many tools are available to gather buzz data; some search the web looking for particular mentions in blogs or posts, others monitor conversations on social media channels and score them on popularity, influence, and sentiment using algorithms that assess emotion and personal engagement. Buzz monitoring can be used to assess the performance of marketing strategies as well as quickly identify negative buzz or product issues that require a response. It can also be used to identify and capitalize on current trends that will shift consumer behaviors.  For example the low-carb diet was buzzing months before sales at grocery stores reflected the trend. Monitoring buzz around certain topics can be used as an anonymous equivalent of a traditional focus group in new product development. For some companies it is important to understand the buzz surrounding a product before committing to the market.

Positive vs. negative buzz
Positive "buzz" is often a goal of viral marketing, public relations, and advertising on Web 2.0 media. It occurs when high levels of individual engagement on social media drive the buzz volume up for positive associations with the product or brand. It gets to the point that capturing the attention of consumers and media easily, which catch people's attention because the information is perceived as entertaining, fascinating, or even newsworthy. Examples of products with strong positive marketing buzz upon introduction are Harry Potter, Volkswagen's New Beetle, Pokémon, Beanie Babies, and The Blair Witch Project. Negative buzz can result from events that generate bad associations with the product in the mind of the public, such as a product safety recall, or from unintended consequences of ill-advised marketing strategies. If not swiftly counteracted, negative buzz can be harmful to a product’s success and the most social network savvy organizations prepare for these eventualities. Examples of negative buzz include the United Colors of Benetton's shock advertising campaign that generated numerous boycotts and lawsuits, and the 2014 General Motors recall of cars many years after a known issue with a faulty ignition switch which they admitted had caused 13 deaths. In the latter case, traditional media also contributed to the amplification of the story through reporting on the ongoing recalls and GM CEO Mary Barra's testimony before the US House of Representatives.

Effectiveness
Buzz works as a marketing tool because individuals in social settings are easier to trust than organizations that may be perceived to have vested interests in promoting their products and/or services.  Interpersonal communication has been shown to be more effective in influencing consumers’ purchasing decisions than advertising alone and the two combined have the greatest power.

A 2013 paper by Xueming Luo and Jie Zhang lists numerous previous studies that have shown a positive correlation between buzz rating and/or volume and product sales or company revenue.  To expand further on that research, Luo and Zhang investigated the relationship of buzz and web traffic and their effect on stock market performance for nine top publicly traded firms in the computer hardware and software industries. Comparing data on consumer buzz rating and volume from a popular electronic product review Website with the firms’ stock returns over the same period, they found a strong positive correlation between online buzz and stock performance.  They also found that due to increasing online content and limitations in consumer attention, competing buzz for rival products could have a negative effect on a firm’s performance.  For these nine companies, buzz had a greater effect than traffic and accounted for approximately 11% of the total variation of stock returns, with 6% due to the firms’ own marketing driving the stock price up and 5% due to rival firms’ buzz driving it down.

As consumers increasingly expect to have access to buzz about products as part of their purchasing decisions and to interact with the brand in social media, successful companies are being driven to adopt social media marketing strategies to stay competitive.  To successfully plan and implement these campaigns requires the ability to predict their effectiveness and therefore the return on investment that can be expected for the dollars expended.

Marketing buzz in the digital age
With the addition of new interactive and digital media technologies into the marketing industry, a significant emphasis has been put on the use of online content to generate buzz about a product, service, or company. Companies well known for this practice are Amazon and Netflix, both of which utilize individual customer patterns and usage trends on these sites to cater the customers' future experiences on the site around the individuals. As a result, this works towards one of the main goals of buzz marketing, to provide each customer with a unique experience that motivates them to purchase a product.

Many companies are also using their online presence to generate buzz by allowing users to post reviews on their sites, as well as the use of reviews posted on third party sites. This concept of online reviewing also works to generate negative buzz, and has been a topic of criticism. Online review site Yelp has been subject to criticism after allegations that business owners were paying the site to only publish the positive reviews, in an attempt to boost sales and hide negative buzz about these businesses. After 10 small businesses filed a lawsuit against Yelp in 2010, the site made the decision to remove the "Favourite Review" option, that previously allowed a business owner to choose the review they liked the most and have it showcased, as well as made content previously hidden from potential customers, visible.

Additionally, the social media site Twitter has been a game changer in terms of marketing buzz in the digital age. The online microblogging site, with web traffic totalling about 350,000 tweets being sent per minute, has quickly become an important tool in business and in marketing. Companies are now creating Twitter pages as a means of personal communication with their target audience. Twitter allows businesses of any size to speak directly to their intended demographic, and allows the customer to communicate back, a feature unique to marketing technologies and methods utilized in the digital age. In addition, companies can pay to have their tweets show up on the Twitter "timeline" of users they want to reach. Many celebrities and public figures carrying a large amount of Twitter "followers" also accept payment to tweet about products.

Some notable examples of buzz marketing in the digital age include the highly successful marketing campaign for the third season of the AMC series Mad Men. The TV channel created an online avatar maker that allowed fans of the show to create an online version of themselves in the 1960s style portrayed on the show. The site experienced over half a million users in the first week and has since been updated to promote consecutive seasons. The campaign gave the show some of its highest ratings seen up to that point. Another successful viral buzz marketing campaign surrounded the 2007 "found footage" motion picture Paranormal Activity. The small budget film was originally released to only select cities. A trailer was then released to the public with the ending calling individuals to go online and "demand" the movie be brought to a city near them. Once a city was demanded enough times, the film would be screened in theatres in that city. The success of this movie can be credited to this marketing campaign, which worked on the principle of "we always want what we don't have".

References

Further reading

Pursuing Marketing Buzz - NY Times article

Consumer behaviour
Viral marketing